Deckdisc is a Brazilian record company that was founded in 1998.

History 
The Deckdisc officially began his career as a record label in 1998, with distribution from Universal Music. The first success was the series "O Som do Barzinho", which reached more than two million copies sold in its five volumes. It was founded by João Augusto, a journalist and producer who was A&R at PolyGram and A&R, VP of EMI. At EMI, João Augusto worked with Mamonas Assassinas, Marisa Monte, Legião Urbana, Os Paralamas do Sucesso, Exaltasamba and many others. In 1999 Deckdisc brought back to the music scene the band Ultraje a Rigor with the launch of the album 18 Anos Sem Tirar! and in 2000 came the biggest hit of all, the launch of the debut album of Falamansa.

In November 2001, Deckdisc became the first Brazilian independent label to launch its own distribution in Rio de Janeiro.

It is also owned by Deckdisc, Editora Musical Deck that has about 6000 songs and released more than 3000 already recorded. Among its authors are big collectors copyright of Brazil, as Pitty, Eduardo Krieger, members of Falamansa, Ira!, Ultraje a Rigor, Sorriso Maroto, Dead Fish and Cachorro Grande. In 2007, Deck bought over 3000 copyrights of Abril Publishing, formerly music publishing arm of Abril Music, a defunct record label owned by Grupo Abril.

Artists
Pitty
Perlla
Strike
Biquini Cavadão
Ultraje a Rigor
Shaaman
Nação Zumbi
Ratos de Porão
Fernanda Takai
Reação Em Cadeia
Black Alien
Dead Fish
Edson e Hudson
Falamansa
Grupo Revelação
Ira!
Maskavo
Matanza
Sorriso Maroto
Zé Henrique & Gabriel
Vivendo do Ócio
Vespas Mandarinas
Gang do Eletro
Far From Alaska
Banda Uó

External links
Official Website 

Brazilian record labels
Record labels established in 1998
1998 establishments in Brazil